Jim Hart is a vibraphonist, drummer and composer on the European contemporary jazz and alternative music scene. He leads Cloudmakers Trio with Michael Janisch (double bass) and Dave Smith (Drum kit) and, since 2017, Cloudmakers Five with saxophonist Antonin-Tri Hoang and guitarist Hannes Riepler, in addition to Janisch and Smith.

Biography 
From 1994–96, Hart attended Chetham's School of Music in Manchester. While a student there, he was a finalist in the BBC Young Musician of the Year competition and also won the John Dankworth Prize for ‘most promising musician’ in the BBC Big Band of the Year competition.

1996 saw Hart move to London to study at the Guildhall School of Music & Drama. During his time in London, he began playing with some of the most established and recognised names on the UK scene including Martin Drew, Ralph Alessi, Stan Sulzmann, Kenny Wheeler, Sir John Dankworth and Dame Cleo Laine, as well as developing close associations with other rising stars of his generation such as Gwilym Simcock, Ivo Neame, Jasper Høiby, Michael Janisch and Dave Smith.

In 2005, he co-founded London's Loop Collective and his group Gemini released the first album on the Collective's label, Loop Records. He has twice been a guest with Wynton Marsalis and the Jazz at the Lincoln Center Jazz Orchestra at the Hackney Empire and Barbican Centre in London, has been the recipient of five British jazz awards, and was nominated for ‘musician of the year’ in the 2011 Parliamentary Jazz Awards. For the last five years, Hart has been listed by DownBeat magazine in the ‘vibraphone’ and ‘rising star’ categories.

He has been resident in Alsace, France, since 2014, and is regularly touring across Europe with Marius Neset’s Quintet and Daniel Erdmann's Velvet Revolution, as well as with his own projects.

Jim Hart is a visiting tutor at the Royal Academy of Music and Guildhall School of Music & Drama in London, as well as tutoring at the National Jazz Collective Summer School and the Jazzwerkstatt in Sarwellingen, Germany.

Projects 
Cloudmakers Trio
Cloudmakers Five
Duo Plus
Electric Biddle
Ivo Neame Quintet
Marius Neset Quintet
Primitive London
Velvet Revolution
Vula Viel

Discography 
Cloudmakers Five – Traveling Pulse (Whirlwind Recordings, 2018)
Jim Hart & Alfred Vogel – Come Rain Come Shine (Boomslang Records, 2017)
Cloudmakers Trio – AJMILIVE #7 (AJMi Live, 2015)
Cloudmakers Trio – Abstract Forces (Whirlwind Recordings, 2014)
Neon Quartet – Subjekt (Edition Records, 2010)
Cloudmakers Trio with Ralph Alessi – Live at Pizza Express (Whirlwind Recordings, 2012)
Neon Quartet – Catch Me (Edition Records, 2010)
Jim Hart's Gemini – Narrada (Loop Records, 2009)
Neon – Here to There (Basho Records, 2008)
Jim Hart Quartet – Words and Music (Woodville Records, 2007)
Jim Hart's Gemini – Emergence (Loop Records, 2006)

Selected discography as sideman

2020 
Vula Viel – What's Not Enough About That (Vula Viel Records): drums

2019 
Vula Viel – Do Not Be Afraid (Vula Viel Records): drums

2017 
Daniel Erdmann's Velvet Revolution – A Short Moment of Zero G (BMC): vibes
Primitive London – Planet Savage (Fresh Sound): drums
Marius Neset – Circle of Chimes (ACT Music): vibes/percussion

2016 
Mosaic – Subterranea (Edition Records): producer

2015 
Emine – Lullaby of Bedlam: drums
Ivo Neame Quintet – Strata (Whirlwind): vibes
Marius Neset – Pinball (ACT Music): vibes
Vula Viel – Good is Good (Vula Viel Records): vibes

2014 
Kristian Borring – Urban Novel (Jellymould Jazz): vibes
Hart, Green, Ridley, Brown – The MJQ Celebration (King's Gambit): vibes
Jiri Slavik – La Jeunesse (Fire): drums

2013 
Marius Neset – Birds (Edition Records): vibes
Rueben Fowler – Between Shadows (Edition Records): vibes

2012 
Ivo Neame – Yatra (Edition Records): vibes

2010 
John Warren – Following On (Fuzzy Moon): vibes

2009 
Ivo Neame – Caught in the Light of Day (Edition Records): vibes
Michael Janisch – Purpose Built (Whirlwind): vibes
John Warren – Finally Beginning (Fuzzy Moon): vibes
Paula Rae Gibson – You Gather My Darkness Like Snow Watch It Melt (Babel): drums/vibes
Sophie Smith – You’d Be So Nice To Come Home To (Woodville): vibes
The New Couriers – Brazilian Thoroughfare (Trio): vibes

2008 
Tom Richards Orchestra – Smoke and Mirrors (Candid): vibes
Neon – Here to There (Basho): vibes
The Matt Wates Sextet – A Picture of You (Audio B): drums

2007 
Quentin Collins – If Not Now, Then When? (Sunlight Square): vibes
Clarvis, Barnes, Hart – Swinging in Studio One (Woodville): vibes
Adam Bishop – Sanctuary (Bishwan): vibes
Anjali Perin Quartet – First Reflection (Jazzizit): drums

2006 
Christian Brewer Quintet – Seesaw (Basho): vibes
Tommasso Starace – Plays the Photos of Elliott Erwitt (Frame): drums
Taeko Kunishima – Red Dragonfly (33 Jazz): drums
The New Couriers – Azule Serape (Trio): vibes

References

External links 
 Official site

Living people
British jazz vibraphonists
British male drummers
British composers
Year of birth missing (living people)
Edition Records artists